The Southend-on-Sea trolleybus system once served the town of Southend-on-Sea, in Essex, England.

History

Southend-on-Sea Corporation had operated a tramway system in the town and surrounding districts since 1901, which had been steadily extended to cover  by 1914. The town also became a county borough in 1914. The tramways had been authorised by a succession of Light Railway Orders, and was managed by a Light Railways Committee. Once World War I was over, the committee looked at ways to meet the transport needs of the increasing number of residents and visitors to the seaside town in the early 1920s. They considered building tramways on reserved rights-of-way, and the introduction of trolleybuses. There was a particular need to improve the service between Victoria Circus and Prittlewell, which was provided by a single track tramway. A report was submitted by the electrical engineer in 1923, and members of the Committee visited Birmingham, where a trolleybus system had begun operating on 27 November 1922.

The committee were sufficiently impressed by the Birmingham system, that they decided to supplement the trams on the service to Prittlewell with trolleybuses, for a trial period of 12 months. They contacted the Railless Electric Traction Company of Leeds, who agreed to provide two trolleybuses on loan, and to erect the overhead wiring. This incorporated a turning circle at Victoria Circus, and a reversing triangle at West Street in Prittlewell. The vehicles supplied had a single deck built on a low chassis with a central entrance. They were fitted with a  motor supplied by Dick, Kerr & Co, and a cam controller operated by a foot pedal, manufactured by English Electric. They were similar in design to vehicles supplied to Ashton-under-Lyne and West Hartlepool, but had an open drivers cab, which gave them a neater appearance. Operation on the Prittlewell route began on 16 October 1925.

The experiment was deemed to be a success, and the Corporation bought the two vehicles from Railless. Trams ceased to be used on the Prittlewell route from 4 March 1927, and the fleet of trolleybuses was expanded by buying an Associated Equipment Company single deck vehicle which had previously run in Leeds, together with the first double deck vehicle, which was obtained from Richard Garrett & Sons of Leiston, Suffolk. The Prittlewell route was extended to Priory Park in early 1929. A route to the seafront was also planned, which would follow roads where there was no tramway service. It ran along White Gate Road to Bankside and opened on 12 December 1928. Further progress towards the seafront was hampered by a low railway bridge, but powers to run along Seaway to Marine Parade and the Kursaal amusement park were obtained in May 1929, and lowering of the roadway beneath the bridge began immediately, so that the new route could be completed in time for the influx of visitors at August bank holiday. The work was inspected by the Ministry of Transport on 1 August, and trolleybuses began running to the Kursaal on 2 August.

To run the service, five more Garrett trolleybuses were obtained, fitted with double deck bodies, capable of seating 60 passengers, and powered by  Bull motors with British Thompson-Houston control gear. The overhead wires on the seafront were galvanised, in an attempt to resist attack by salt water, and this proved successful, as it was used elsewhere on the system. The possibility of extending the system westwards from Prittlewell was soon proposed, and the Corporation obtained an Act of Parliament in 1930, which authorised an additional nine routes. The second ran eastwards from Victoria Circus along Guildford Road and North Avenue to Hamstel Road. It was a similar length and opened on 31 July 1932. The Corporation negotiated a co-ordinated scheme with the local bus company, which meant that the new trolleybus routes were free from competition by motor buses.

Expansion
They had a passenger entrance at the rear, and an exit at the front, which improved the speed at which passengers could be unloaded when the service was busy. Two years later, a batch of four two-axle vehicles were purchased from the same manufacturer. These had lowbridge bodywork, with an offset sunken gangway on the upper deck, which was thought to make the vehicles more stable, and might enable them to run on new routes which included low bridges. Unusually, the trolleybuses had a full front with a dummy radiator, making them look like motor buses. A further batch of five similar vehicles were ordered in 1933, and many continued in service almost to the end of operations, although they were altered cosmetically by the removal of the radiator. The Corporation also took delivery of an English Electric demonstrator in May 1932. This had been tried out in Bradford and London before being displayed at the Commercial Motor Transport Exhibition in 1931. It had three axles, and staircases at the front and rear, with the front exit featuring a twin-hinged door. It had a half cab and a radiator, but was rebuilt with a full front and no radiator soon after 1945. It was numbered 116 in the fleet, but in 1951 it ceased to be used in passenger service, and was converted to a mobile toilet.

Southend owned some other unusual vehicles. Number 122 was another demonstrator, which had been exhibited at the London Commercial Motor Show in 1933. It was then loaded to the Corporation, before they actually bought it. It was a 2-axle double deck vehicle, with a centre entrance, and was the only trolleybus ever built by the Gloucester Railway Carriage and Wagon Company. Number 123 was also a rarity, being one of only five 'Q' type trolleybuses built by the Associated Equipment Company (AEC). It featured a front entrance, and had seating for 56 passengers.

In 1933, Shoeburyness, located to the east of Southend, became part of the Borough, and there were proposals to extend the trolleybus network along the seafront from the Kursaal to Thorpe Bay and on to Shoeburyness. On 21 June 1934, the seafront route was extended westwards a little, to the pier head, and the Corporation obtained a Provisional Order to allow the construction of the route eastwards. Other work was in progress, and the Fairfax Drive route to the west was extended to Chalkwell Schools, which was also served by the tramway running along London Road. By 1936, more than 8.5 million journeys a year were being made by trolleybus, and the fleet at the time consisted of 21 double deck vehicles. Plans to discontinue operation of the tramway network were approved in 1938, and in 1939 the Southend-on-Sea Trolley Order made provision for running trolleybuses along all the former tramway routes. Six more vehicles were obtained from AEC, and it was hoped that the changeover from trams to trolleybuses could be completed by the spring of 1941. However, such plans were affected by the outbreak of the Second World War, and although 36 more trolleybuses were ordered to allow for the conversion and the extension to Shoeburyness, delivery was to be made "when conditions permitted".

Demise
The 36 new trolleybuses were never delivered. Trams had been replaced on the route from the Kursaal to Thorpe Bay in 1939, with the last tram running on 27 May. The corporation only intended to use trolleybuses on this route in the summer months, and the extension out to Shoeburyness was serviced by motor buses. When the war started, the trolleybuses were withdrawn from the sea-front route. The hostilities also saw a reprieval for the tramway system, if only briefly. The corporation argued that because the replacement had been scheduled for early 1941, essential maintenance had not been carried out, and if the tramways were to be retained for any length of time, considerable expenditure would be needed to put them back into good order. They obtained the consent of the Ministry of War Transport in 1941, and decided to replace the trams as soon as possible. It was not feasible to obtain enough trolleybuses to run the full service, and so parts of the tramway network would be replaced by motor buses. The last tram ran on 8 April 1942, and although the overhead wiring was altered to allow trolleybuses to run along the London Road to Chalkwell Schools, with the new section forming part of a circular route with the existing line along Fairfax Drive, there was a lengthy delay between the end of the trams and the start of the trolleybuses. Motor buses worked the section from Chalkwell Schools to Leigh. Part of the route eastwards to Southchurch began operating in 1943, and this formed another circular route when trolleybuses began operating along Hamstel Road to link up with the North Avenue route. The route from Southchurch to Thorpe Bay, where trams had run on a reserved track rather than on roads had been replaced by motor buses in 1938.

By the standards of the various now-defunct trolleybus systems in the United Kingdom, the Southend system was a moderately sized one, with a total of four routes, and a maximum fleet of 34 trolleybuses. None of the former Southend trolleybuses is recorded as having been preserved.

Fleet

See also

History of Southend-on-Sea
Arriva Southend
Transport in Southend-on-Sea
List of trolleybus systems in the United Kingdom

References

Notes

Bibliography

External links

SCT'61 website - photos and descriptions of Southend-on-Sea trolleybuses and early motorbuses
Southend Corporation Transport: The Trolleybus Network 1925 to 1954 - a short history
National Trolleybus Archive
British Trolleybus Society, based in Reading
National Trolleybus Association, based in London

Transport in Southend-on-Sea
Southend-on-Sea
Southend-on-Sea